Emile Pandolfi (born 1946) is an American pianist. He is noted for his renditions of show tunes. As well as his renditions of classical music.

Background

Pandolfi was born in New York and grew up in Greenville, South Carolina, where he still resides. He began studying piano at the age of five, and made his symphonic debut with the Greenville Symphony Orchestra at age 14, performing the Mozart piano concerto no. 11, in F major, K 413.

He attended Greenville High School, then Furman University, where he did his preparatory studies in music. He transferred to Baylor University, where he studied for two years. Following his piano teacher, Thomas Redcay, he transferred to Texas Tech, where he earned his Bachelor of Music degree.

After college, Pandolfi moved to St Thomas in the US Virgin Islands for two years as a chorus teacher in a public school. In the evenings, he played at the Caribbean Beach Hotel, as part of a Calypso band called "The Castaways." From there he moved to Sussex, England for another two years, playing pubs and restaurants.

Career 
Upon returning to the United States, Pandolfi spent two years in Denver as part of a house band, Buddy Brown and the Bittersuite, and then moved  to Los Angeles where he played for dance classes, acting seminars, actor/singer auditions, and in various piano lounges. It was here that he became one of the house pianists for the Comedy Store. He worked there for six years, performing with such entertainers as Jay Leno, David Letterman, and Robin Williams, among others.
He was a featured performer at the 1984 Summer Olympics, playing "Rhapsody in Blue." During this time he also studied comedy writing (an ability he was to use many years later to write his own show) and learned to play for comedy improv.

After spending 15 years in LA, Pandolfi moved with his family back to Greenville, where he created his recording label, MagicMusic Productions.
His first recording, "By Request" is a compilation of Broadway and movie themes arranged for piano solo. It remains his top-selling album to date, with sales in excess of six hundred thousand units. Pandolfi has strong followings on Spotify, Apple Music, Pandora, and all the major streaming sites.

As a classically trained musician, Pandolfi had to teach himself to play music by ear.

"It took two years of arduous, disciplined practice to train my ear to do something that some musicians do automatically. Yet, as odd as it may seem, many classical musicians, despite being vastly well-trained, often cannot play a simple song without consulting the sheet music. I was one of those. I intuitively knew that there was something very wrong with this picture, and decided to do something about it.

"The very first tune I worked on was 'Blue Moon.' I already knew the melody, but had never played it without reading the music. I just hunt-and-punched my way around for a week or so till I made some sense of it. I began to understand how playing-from-listening actually worked. I followed by learning one song after another—although I still took books to the piano lounge where I was playing, just in case—and began to wean myself off the written page. I was encouraged to learn to read 'fake books' and start to improvise over the chord symbols. Now, years later, I play everything except classical pieces by ear. It just gives you more freedom."

Pandolfi has been actively involved with charity organizations, performing in benefit concerts for Hospice, several South Carolina women's shelters, The Ara Parseghian Foundation (Neimann-Pick Type C disease), United Way, The Red Cross, The American Heart Association, and others.

Musical influences 
Pandolfi's greatest musical influences are the Romantic classical French composer Claude Debussy, the classical Polish composer Frederic Chopin, and the 20th century Russian composer Sergei Rachmaninoff.

Personal life

Emile has two living sisters, Pamela Pandolfi and Barbara Coventry; and a brother, Guy Pandolfi.

Emile and his wife Judy have three daughters.

Discography
 By Request -1990
 An Affair to Remember -1991
 Remember Me -1992
 Once Upon a Romance -1992
 Nights on Broadway -1993
 Country Impressions -1994
 Some Enchanted Evening -1994
 It Might as Well Be Spring -1995
 Chopin -1996
 My Foolish Heart -1997
 The Second Time Around -1997
 Evening in Venice -1999
 What a Wonderful World -1999
 Rhapsody in Blue -2000
 Malaguena - Ritual Fire Dance
 Days of Wine & Roses -2004
 Starry Starry Night -2002
 Secret Love -1995
 Unforgettable Love Songs -1998
 Evening Romance -1999
 A Child's Gift of Lullabyes
 Believe
 Quiet Passion
 A Lovely Way to Spend An Evening
 Malagueña/Ritual Fire Dance
 How Sweet the Sound
 Maleguena
 So This is Love
 I See the Light

Compilation albums
 Please Welcome... Best of Volume 1 - 1993
 Secret Love: The Best of Emile Pandolfi, Vol. 2 -1996

Christmas albums
 White Christmas
 Sleigh Ride
 Do You Hear What I Hear?
 In the Holiday Spirit
 Winter Wonderland

References

External links
 Official Website
 Fan Page

Living people
Furman University alumni
Baylor University alumni
American male pianists
21st-century American pianists
21st-century American male musicians
1946 births
Greenville Senior High School (Greenville, South Carolina) alumni